Events from the year 1331 in the Kingdom of Scotland.

Incumbents
Monarch – David II

Events
 24 November – David and his wife are crowned at Scone.

Deaths 
 November/December – John Stewart, 1st Earl of Angus

See also

 Timeline of Scottish history

References

 
Years of the 14th century in Scotland
Wars of Scottish Independence